Blanchefleur ("white flower", also Blanziflor, Flanziflor) is a female given name popular in the High Middle Ages.

Fictional characters with the name include:

The mother of Sir Tristan, sister of King Mark and wife of Lord Rivalin.
The heroine of Floris and Blanchefleur.
Daughter of Theirry, King of Morianel, in Garin le Loherain.
Niece of Gornemant and wife of Percival, cousin of Gurzgi, Lascoyt, Schentefleurs and Liaze.

Arthurian characters
French feminine given names